This is a list of Kazakh football transfers in the summer transfer window 2017 by club. Only clubs of the 2017 Kazakhstan Premier League are included, with the transfer window running from 13 June until 10 July 2017.

Kazakhstan Premier League 2017

Aktobe

In:

Out:

Akzhayik

In:

Out:

Astana

In:

Out:

Atyrau

In:

Out:

Irtysh

In:

Out:

Kairat

In:

Out:

Kaisar

In:

Out:

Okzhetpes

In:

Out:

Ordabasy

In:

Out:

Shakhter Karagandy

In:

Out:

Taraz

In:

Out:

Tobol

In:

Out:

References

Kazakhstan
2017
Transfers